William Brien may refer to:

 William Roy Brien (1930–1987), English footballer
 William W. Brien (born 1957), American physician and mayor of Beverly Hills, California 
William Brian, List of Philadelphia Eagles players

See also
William Bryan (disambiguation)